Thomas Brunce (c. 1388 – 6 December 1445) was a 15th-century Bishop of Rochester and then Bishop of Norwich.

Life
Brunce was the son of William Brunce of Brunce's Court in Sutton Courtenay in Berkshire (now Oxfordshire). He studied at Oxford, possibly at New College, where he became friends with Thomas Beckington (later Bishop of Bath and Wells).

Brunce entered the Church and held a number of posts in Lincolnshire, being collated Archdeacon of Stow in 1419. He also undertook diplomatic missions on the Continent for King Henry V. In 1427 he was collated Archdeacon of Berkshire and in 1429 was elected Bishop of Chichester, although the latter position was given to Simon Sydenham instead. He was Dean of Salisbury (since 1431) when, Pope Eugene IV wanted to make him Bishop of Worcester on 24 September 1433, but King Henry VI of England had other ideas and he was made Bishop of Rochester instead on 21 February 1435.

Brunce was consecrated on 1 May 1435. On 19 September 1437, he was transferred to the see of Norwich, where he is remembered for upholding the rights of the Cathedral over the townsfolk and for erecting the great rood loft. He died on 6 December 1445 at the Episcopal manor of Hoxne in Suffolk.

Executors of Thomas Brouns, former bishop of Norwich, are listed in 1460 as litigants in the Court of Common Pleas.

Notes

Citations

References

1380s births
1445 deaths
People from Sutton Courtenay
Bishops of Chichester
Bishops of Worcester
Bishops of Rochester
Bishops of Norwich
Deans of Salisbury
Archdeacons of Stow
Archdeacons of Berkshire
15th-century English Roman Catholic bishops